Tre'Quan Smith (born January 7, 1996) is an American football wide receiver for the New Orleans Saints of the National Football League (NFL). He played college football at UCF.

Early years
Smith attended Village Academy High School in Delray Beach, Florida. He did not start playing football until his freshman year in high school. He committed to the University of Central Florida (UCF) to play college football.

College career
Smith attended and played at UCF from 2014 to 2017. During his collegiate career, he had 168 receptions for 2,748 yards and 22 touchdowns. After his junior season, he entered the 2018 NFL Draft. He played in the 2018 Senior Bowl.

Collegiate statistics

Professional career
On January 6, 2018, Smith released a statement through his Twitter account announcing his decision to forgo his remaining eligibility and declare for the 2018 NFL Draft. On January 10, 2018, it was announced that Smith had accepted his invitation to play in the Senior Bowl. Although he was a redshirt junior, Smith was eligible to play since he had already graduated. Smith had a solid week of practice during the Senior Bowl and was able to maintain his draft stock. On January 27, 2018, Smith caught five receptions for 83-yards and scored on a 14-yard touchdown pass by quarterback Mike White to help the North defeat the South 45–16.

Smith attended the NFL Scouting Combine in Indianapolis and completed all of the combine and positional drills. He earned the third best broad jump and 14th best time in the 40-yard dash of all players who participated. On March 29, 2018, he participated at Central Florida's pro day, but opted to stand on his combine numbers and only performed positional drills. Smith attended a private workouts with the Tampa Bay Buccaneers and New York Giants. At the conclusion of the pre-draft process, Smith was projected to be a third or fourth round pick by NFL draft experts and scouts. He was ranked as the 10th best wide receiver in the draft by Scouts Inc. and was ranked the 11th best wide receiver by DraftScout.com.

The New Orleans Saints selected Smith in the third round with the 91st overall pick in the 2018 NFL Draft. Smith was the 10th wide receiver drafted in 2018.

2018 season
On May 21, 2018, the New Orleans Saints signed Smith to a four-year, $3.42 million contract that includes a signing bonus of $817,024.

Smith made his NFL debut in the season opener against the Tampa Bay Buccaneers. He did not record any receptions as the Saints lost 48–40. In the next game against the Cleveland Browns, he recorded his first NFL reception, which went for 18 yards in the 21–18 victory. During Week 5 on Monday Night Football against the Washington Redskins, Smith caught a 62-yard touchdown from Drew Brees, helping Brees surpass Peyton Manning for the most career passing yards in NFL history. The touchdown was part of a three-reception, 111-yard, two-touchdown performance for Smith. During a 48–7 Week 11 victory over the reigning Super Bowl champion Philadelphia Eagles, he recorded ten receptions for 152 yards and a touchdown.

Smith finished his rookie year with 28 receptions for 427 yards and five touchdowns in 15 games and seven starts. The Saints finished with the top seed in the NFC with a 13–3 record and received a first-round postseason bye. In the postseason, Smith had two receptions for 25 yards and a five-yard rush.

2019 season
In the season-opener against the Houston Texans, Smith caught two passes for 26 yards and a touchdown in the narrow 30–28 victory. Battling an ankle injury for much of the season, Smith finished his second season with 18 receptions for 234 yards and five touchdowns.

2020 season
In Week 4 against the Detroit Lions, Smith caught four passes for 54 yards and his first two receiving touchdowns of the season during the 35–29 win.  He was placed on injured reserve on December 24, 2020. On January 16, 2021, Smith was activated off of the injured reserve ahead of the Saints divisional playoff game against the Tampa Bay Buccaneers. In the game, Smith recorded three catches for 85 yards and two touchdowns, including a 56-yard touchdown reception on a Jameis Winston trick play, during the 30–20 loss.

On September 10, 2021, Smith was placed on injured reserve. He was activated on October 25.

On March 30, 2022, Smith re-signed with the Saints on a two-year, $6 million contract.

NFL career statistics

References

External links
New Orleans Saints profile
UCF Knights bio

1996 births
Living people
Sportspeople from Delray Beach, Florida
Players of American football from Florida
American football wide receivers
UCF Knights football players
New Orleans Saints players